Hedwig Rieder (8 March 1920 – 13 April 1978) was a Swiss fencer. She competed in the women's individual foil events at the 1948 and 1952 Summer Olympics.

References

External links
 

1920 births
1978 deaths
Swiss female foil fencers
Olympic fencers of Switzerland
Fencers at the 1948 Summer Olympics
Fencers at the 1952 Summer Olympics